Cecilia Soria (born c. 1991) is a member of the provincial chamber of deputies in Mendoza Province, Argentina. She was elected as a candidate of the Workers' Left Front. She was previously a sociology student.

External links
 http://www.laizquierdadiario.com/Cecilia-Soria-2871 

21st-century Argentine women politicians
21st-century Argentine politicians
People from Mendoza Province
1990s births
Living people
Year of birth uncertain
Place of birth missing (living people)